Big Mound may refer to:
The Battle of Big Mound, a United States Army victory in July 1863 over Native American tribes in the Dakota Territory
Big Mound City, Florida
Big Mound Township, Wayne County, Illinois